Satirical magazines of Turkey have a long tradition, with the first magazine (Diyojen) published in 1869. There are currently around 20 satirical magazines; the leading ones are Penguen (70,000 weekly circulation), LeMan (50,000) and Uykusuz. 

Historical examples include Oğuz Aral's magazine Gırgır (which reached a circulation of 500,000 in the 1970s) and Marko Paşa (launched 1946). Others include L-Manyak and Lombak.

References

Satirical